A beer cocktail is a cocktail that is made by mixing beer with other ingredients (such as a distilled beverage) or another style of beer. 
In this type of cocktail, the primary ingredient is usually beer.

List of beer cocktails

Black and tan – A layered drink made from a blend of pale ale and a dark beer such as a stout or porter. Traditionally uses bitter and stout.
Black Velvet – A layered drink using a combination of Stout and sparkling wine or champagne.
Blow My Skull – Ale or porter with rum and brandy
Boilermaker – Mild ale mixed with bottled brown ale (United Kingdom). The American version is a glass of beer with a shot of whiskey.
Flaming Doctor Pepper – a flaming drink made from a bomb shot of high-proof alcohol and Amaretto ignited and dropped into a pint of beer.
Hangman's blood – Porter combined with brandy, gin and rum. 
 Irish car bomb – a pint glass containing half a pint of Irish stout with a mixed bomb shot of Irish cream and Irish whiskey.
Lunchbox – Beer mixed with orange juice and a shot of Amaretto.
Michelada – Beer with citrus juice (e.g. lime juice), tomato juice, seasoning, chili sauce and Worcestershire sauce.
Porchcrawler – Equal parts of beer, vodka, and lemonade concentrate.
Queen Mary – Beer with grenadine and maraschino cherries, named for Mary of Teck.
Red Eye – beer, tomato juice, with optional lemon or hot sauce.
Sake bomb – Shot of sake poured or dropped into a glass of beer. 
Shandy or radler – Beer with lemonade, citrus soda, ginger beer, ginger ale, or fruit juice, e.g. grapefruit.
Snakebite – Equal parts lager and cider.
Somaek – Soju mixed with beer. 
U-boot – Glass of beer with a bomb shot containing vodka.

See also
 List of cocktails
 Beer mix
 Bierlikör – beer liqueur

References

Beer culture
Beer
 
2010s in food